Georgia Harmer is a Canadian singer-songwriter, whose debut album Stay in Touch was released in 2022 on Arts & Crafts Productions.

She is the niece of Sarah Harmer and the daughter of Mary Harmer and Gord Tough; all of whom are former members of the band Weeping Tile. Tough is the guitarist for Sarah Harmer and Kathleen Edwards.

At the age of 9, Harmer was in the child band I Eat Kids, whose members also included Tim Vesely's daughter Sadie. She attended McGill University in the late 2010s before dropping out to pursue her own music career. She then took a gig as a backing vocalist for Alessia Cara. 

Harmer released her debut single "Headrush" in 2021. In 2022, she followed up with the singles "Austin", "All in My Mind", "Talamanca" and "Top Down" in advance of releasing her album, Stay in Touch on April 22, 2022. She supported the album with a national tour as an opening act for Dan Mangan.

References

External links

21st-century Canadian women singers
21st-century Canadian guitarists
Canadian women singer-songwriters
Canadian women rock singers
Canadian women pop singers
Canadian folk-pop singers
Canadian folk rock musicians
Arts & Crafts Productions artists
Musicians from Ontario
Writers from Ontario
Living people
Year of birth missing (living people)
21st-century women guitarists